Fanny Lucía Martínez Buenaventura (born 8 February 1973), better known professionally as Fanny Lu, is a Colombian singer, songwriter and actress from Santiago de Cali, Colombia. She studied at the University of the Andes and received a degree in industrial engineering. She is the mother of two children, Mateo and Valentina.

Fanny Lu's first job in the entertainment industry was in Colombia, as hostess to a music magazine called Siempre Música. She then moved on to radio voice in the principal radio stations from her country. However, she wasn't recognized until 1998, when she made part of the cast from the Colombian soap opera Perro Amor.

In 2006 Fanny Lu released Lágrimas Cálidas, winning fame in Colombia and some countries from Latin America, with her two singles that reached the top on the Latin charts. Her 2008 album Dos consolidated her musician career, giving credibility as a famous artist. Her single "Tú No Eres Para Mi" was number one in several countries. She released her third album, Felicidad y Perpetua in November 2011. Her humanitarian work granted her to be named "Goodwill Ambassador" from the FAO.

Early and personal life

Fanny Lu was born in Santiago de Cali, Colombia to Colombian parents. She attended Colegio Bolivar before moving to France to finish her primary education. After returning to Latin America, she studied at the University of the Andes, where she graduated with a degree in industrial engineering. She is the mother of two children. In 2009 she filed for divorce.

Acting career
In 1994, Fanny Lu became a TV presenter on the popular show Locomotora. Afterward, she went into the music industry. She has appeared in many television series such as, Perro Amor and Más Vale Tarde. She also voices Beth in the Spanish version of the Sony Pictures animated film, Open Season (Amigos Salvajes). In 2012, the second season of Pequeños Gigantes reality show, she was chosen as replacement judge.

Music career

Lu's debut album, Lágrimas Cálidas, was released in 2006. The album spent five weeks at No. 1. The lead single "No Te Pido Flores" also spent seven weeks at No. 1 on the Hot 100 Billboard charts in Latin America, Colombia, Peru, Venezuela and Mexico. In the U.S., the song peaked at No. 16 on the Billboard Hot Latin Songs and No. 1 on Billboard Tropical Songs chart. The second single from her debut album, "Y Si Te Digo", peaked at No. 1 on the Billboard Hot Latin Tracks chart.

Her second album, Dos, was number one in its first week in Colombia. Dos was released the following week in the United States and Puerto Rico on December 16. The lead single, "Tú No Eres Para Mi", was the No. 1 song played on radio for 12 weeks. This single also peaked at No. 1 on the Billboard Hot Latin Tracks in April 2009. On October 16, 2009, Lu was nominated Goodwill Ambassador of the Food and Agriculture Organization of the United Nations.

In 2010, Fanny Lu was chosen to record the Spanish version of the theme song, "Something That I Want", ("Algo Quiero") for the Disney film Tangled.

She released the first single, "Fanfarrón", from her third studio album, Felicidad y Perpetua. The second single is "Ni Loca".

Filmography

Discography

 Lágrimas Cálidas (2006)
 Dos (2008)
 Felicidad y Perpetua (2011)

Awards and nominations
Fanny Lu was nominated for two Lo Nuestro Awards. The ceremony took place on February 21, 2008 and aired on Univisión. She was nominated for Female Artist of the Year and Artist of the Year under the Tropical-genre categories. In 2009, she was once again nominated for Female Artist of the Year under the Tropical-genre category.

Lu received six Latin Billboard Music Award nominations in 2008, including Tropical Album of the Year and Tropical New Artist Album of the Year for her album "Lagrimas Calidas" as well as Tropical Airplay Song of the Year and Tropical Airplay New Artist Song of the Year - categories that her singles "No Te Pido Flores" and "Y Si Te Digo" share together. The awards aired on Telemundo in April 2007. She went on to win the award for Tropical Airplay New Artist Song of the Year for her song "Y Si Te Digo".

Premios Nuestra Tierra
A Premio Nuestra Tierra is an accolade that recognize outstanding achievement in the Colombian music industry. Fanny Lu has received four nominations.

|-
| style="text-align:center;" rowspan="2"|2014 || Herself || Best Tropical Solo Artist or Group  || 
|-
| Herself|| Tweeter of the Year ||

See also
Music of Colombia

References

External links
  
 
 

1973 births
21st-century Colombian women singers
Colombian television actresses
Living people
Colombian pop singers
Tropipop musicians
People from Cali
Colombian singer-songwriters
Latin pop singers
Universal Music Latin Entertainment artists
20th-century Colombian actresses
21st-century Colombian actresses
University of Los Andes (Colombia) alumni
Women in Latin music